TV3 (pronounced as Tivi Tiga) is a Malaysian free-to-air television channel owned by Media Prima conglomerate. TV3 is the third and third oldest TV station in Malaysia. It was launched on 1 June 1984 as the country's first and oldest private television channel. As of October 2021, TV3 remains to be the most-watched television station in Malaysia with about 17% of its viewing share among other Malaysian television stations, followed by NTV7 and TV9 with 15% of its viewing share, making two of them become the second most-watched television station in the country, despite the declining viewership of 3 free-to-air television channels.

History 

TV3 (Sistem Televisyen Malaysia Berhad) officially began broadcasting in the Greater Kuala Lumpur (the area surrounding Kuala Lumpur, capital of Malaysia) in conjunction the Hijri date of the first day of the holy month of Ramadan year 1404 AH (1 June 1984) at 6:00pm local time. The nation's first privately owned TV station was officially launched with a five-hour broadcast time from 6:00pm to 11:00pm. The television channel used to broadcast from a building in Jalan Liku, Bangsar, Lembah Pantai, Kuala Lumpur before it moved to Sri Pentas, Bandar Utama, Petaling Jaya, Selangor in 1995. Similar to state-owned TV channel RTM TV1, TV3 introduced daily morning transmissions on 1 March 1994, along with the debut of the channel's flagship breakfast television programme – Malaysia Hari Ini (Malaysia Today).

On 22 September 2003, both Sistem Televisyen Malaysia Berhad and The New Straits Times Press (Malaysia) Berhad were spun off from Malaysian Resources Corporation Berhad, which owned the companies since 1993 to form Media Prima Group.

Criticism and controversy
In Singapore, the channel ran into controversy because it broadcast programmes in Cantonese, which ran contrary to the Singapore government's policy of promoting Mandarin instead of other dialects in media. Consequently, it prevented people in government-built housing blocks from installing the special antennas required to receive the channel. In addition, it prevented local newspapers and magazines from carrying listings for TV3, even though these were available for the other Malaysian channels. TV3 was available on Singapore CableVision (now StarHub TV), Singapore's only cable TV operator, until it was removed at 9pm, 22 July 2002 owing to copyright issues. 
In 2007, a reality television programme broadcast on TV3 called Sensasi was banned amid accusations that host Awal Ashaari "humiliating a person to sensationalise the issue" along with complaints to actress Rosnah Mat Aris that touched on sensitive issues relating to Islam by linking Siti Khadijah, wife of the Islamic prophet Muhammad to the present issue of women courting younger men. Another reality television show, Teleskop, was banned in 1995 after panellist Nasir Jani's swearing towards Prime Minister at the time, Mahathir Mohamad on air. 
In 2010, TV3 broadcast a Hari Raya Aidilfitri advertisement featuring an old man on a flying trishaw and blooming lotus-like flowers, which were said to be reminiscent of Christian and Hindu motifs. This sparked an outcry from Malay supremacist organisations and the Muslim far-right who accused it of "humiliating and insulting Islam". The advertisement was withdrawn after just a few days and TV3 was fined MYR50,000 for the broadcast, in addition to issuing an on-air apology. 
In 2015, TV3 was accused of plagiarism, after it was revealed that its new news design was copied from the Dutch RTL Nieuws, which had introduced its new news design in May 2014. 
From 1 April 2016 to 31 December 2016, A teleshopping block called CJ Wow Shop was broadcast across Media Prima channels. Some Media Prima channels (especially NTV7 and 8TV And TV9) were more affected by the changes. This block attracted huge criticism on social media as a large part of daytime schedule has been replaced by CJ Wow Shop, which these slots had been previously running mostly reruns, religious programming and children's programming.

See also
 Buletin FM
 List of television stations in Malaysia
 NTV7
 8TV 中文
 TV9
 Media Prima
 New Straits Times
 Berita Harian

References

External links
 

1984 establishments in Malaysia
Media Prima
Television stations in Malaysia
Television channels and stations established in 1984
Malay language television stations